Yaft Rural District is in Moradlu District of Meshgin Shahr County, Ardabil province, Iran. At the census of 2006, its population was 3,493 in 544 households; there were 2,900 inhabitants in 710 households at the following census of 2011; and in the most recent census of 2016, the population of the rural district was 2,419 in 666 households. The largest of its 14 villages was Mashiran, with 815 people.

The 14th-century author Hamdallah Mustawfi listed Yāft in his Nuzhat al-Qulub as a forested district comprising about 20 villages. He wrote that it had a warm climate, produced grain and some fruit, and was assessed at a tax value of 4,000 dinars.

References 

Meshgin Shahr County

Rural Districts of Ardabil Province

Populated places in Ardabil Province

Populated places in Meshgin Shahr County